Epedanidae is a family of the harvestman infraorder Grassatores with about 200 described species. They are the sister group of the Gonyleptoidea.

The Epedanidae are endemic to Asia. The subfamily Dibuninae forms the predominant harvestman fauna of the Philippines. The other three subfamilies are more predominant in Indonesia, Malaysia and Thailand, and some are found in Burma and Nepal. Some species occur outside this region, in India, China, Vietnam and Japan. One species is even endemic to New Guinea. The oldest fossils of the family are known from the Cenomanian aged Burmese amber of Myanmar.

Description
The body size ranges from two to five millimeters, with thin legs ranging from six to 26 mm. The chelicerae are heavy with strong teeth in both fingers. The pedipalps are long and strong, with powerful spines lining the inside of the claw. Most species are light brown with few black mottling. Some species possess white patches on the scutum. The pedipalps are much more heavily spined in males, together with a swollen cheliceral hand.

Name
The type genus Epedanus is derived from Ancient Greek epedanos "weak, feeble".

Genera
For a list of all currently described species see List of Epedanidae species.

Dibuninae Roewer, 1912
Dibunus Loman, 1906

Epedaninae Sørensen, in L. Koch 1886
Alloepedanus S. Suzuki, 1985
Balabanus Suzuki, 1977
Caletorellus Roewer, 1938
Epedanellus Roewer, 1911
Epedanidus Roewer, 1945
Epedanulus Roewer, 1913
Epedanus Thorell, 1876
Euepedanus Roewer, 1915
Funkikoa Roewer, 1927
Heteroepedanus Roewer, 1912
Aboriscus Roewer, 1940
Lobonychium Roewer, 1938
Metathyreotus Roewer, 1913
Metepedanulus Roewer, 1913
Metepedanus Roewer, 1912
Mosfora Roewer, 1938
Nanepedanus Roewer, 1938
Neoepedanus Roewer, 1912
Paratakaoia S. Suzuki, 1985
Parepedanulus Roewer, 1913
Plistobunus Pocock, 1903
Pseudoepedanus Suzuki, 1969
Pseudomarthana P. D. Hillyard, 1985
Takaoia Roewer, 1911
Thyreotus Thorell, 1889
 Toccolus Roewer, 1927
Zepedanulus Roewer, 1927

Acrobuninae Roewer, 1912
Acrobunus Thorell, 1891
Anacrobunus Roewer, 1927
Harpagonellus Roewer, 1927
Heterobiantes Roewer, 1912
Metacrobunus Roewer, 1915
Paracrobunus Suzuki, 1977

Sarasinicinae Roewer, 1923
Acanthepedanus Roewer, 1912
Albertops Roewer, 1938
Asopella Sørensen, 1932
Delicola Roewer, 1938
Gintingius Roewer, 1938
Kilungius Roewer, 1915
Koyanus Roewer, 1938
Kuchingius Roewer, 1927
Nobeoka Roewer, 1938
Opelytus Roewer, 1927
Padangcola Roewer, 1963
 Panticola Roewer, 1938
Parepedanus Roewer, 1912
Pasohnus Suzuki, 1976
Pseudobiantes Hirst, 1911
Punanus Roewer, 1938
Sarasinica Strand, 1914
Sembilanus Roewer, 1938
Sinistus Roewer, 1938
Siponnus Roewer, 1927
Sungsotia Tsurusaki, 1995
Tegestria Roewer, 1936
Tonkinatus Roewer, 1938

incertae sedis
Beloniscellus Roewer, 1912
Beloniscops Roewer, 1949
Belonisculus Roewer, 1923
Beloniscus Thorell, 1891
Buparellus Roewer, 1949
Bupares Thorell, 1889
Dhaulagirius Martens, 1977
Dumaguetes Roewer, 1927
Parabeloniscus Suzuki, 1967
Parabupares S. Suzuki, 1982
Sotekia S. Suzuki, 1982
Tithaeus Thorell, 1890
Tokunosia Suzuki, 1964

†Petrobunoides Selden et al. 2016 Burmese amber, Myanmar, Cenomanian
†Biungulus Bartel et al, 2020 Burmese amber, Myanmar, Cenomanian
†Gigantocheles Bartel et al, 2020 Burmese amber, Myanmar, Cenomanian

Footnotes

References
 's Biology Catalog: Epedanidae
  (eds.) (2007): Harvestmen - The Biology of Opiliones. Harvard University Press 

Harvestman families